The Coalition for Freedom and Justice (I’tilaf al-hurriyya wa al-'adala), also known as the movement, is a coalition of opposition and reform groups in the 2011–2012 Saudi Arabian protests active in Saudi Arabia's Eastern Province.

The coalition was formed in March 2012, inspired by the decentralised Bahraini 14 February Youth Coalition, and has adopted some of its tactics. The groups have activists from a wide range of ideological backgrounds, but are mostly united by their demands for greater democracy and human rights.

Although only active in Eastern Province, the coalition has a national focus, and has tried to coordinate with different groups in other parts of Saudi Arabia.

The groups that make up the Coalition for Freedom and Justice include:

 Day of Qatifi Rage for the Release of Forgotten Prisoners
 Eastern Province Revolution
 Free Dignity Movement
 Free Youth Movement
 Youth Reform Movement

References

External links
Eastern Province Revolution Facebook Arabic English
Eastern Province Revolution Twitter Arabic English

2011–2012 Saudi Arabian protests
Human rights organisations based in Saudi Arabia
Organizations of the Arab Spring
Political parties in Saudi Arabia
Political party alliances in Asia
Saudi Arabian democracy movements
Saudi Arabian opposition groups